Eupithecia cestatoides is a moth in the family Geometridae first described by James Halliday McDunnough in 1949. It is found in the US state of California.

The wingspan is about 21 mm. Adults are practically identical to Eupithecia cestata in color and maculation of the forewings and in all outward structural characters. The hindwings are heavily suffused with smoky along the inner and outer margin, leaving the cell a smoky whitish with a not prominent discal dot. Adults have been recorded on wing from March to June.

References

Moths described in 1949
cestatoides
Moths of North America